Pfaffia glomerata is a medicinal plant native to Argentina, Bolivia, Cerrado, and Pantanal vegetation in Brazil.

References

Amaranthaceae
Flora of Argentina
Flora of Brazil
Flora of Bolivia
Flora of the Cerrado
Medicinal plants of South America